NetXMS is an open-source network management system. It can be used for monitoring entire IT infrastructures, starting with SNMP-capable hardware (such as switches and routers) and ending with applications on servers.

Victor Kirhenshtein and Alex Kirhenshtein are the original authors and current maintainers of NetXMS. NetXMS runs natively on Windows, Linux, and other Unix variants. It is licensed under the GNU General Public License version 2 as published by the Free Software Foundation.

Overview
NetXMS features include:

Monitoring of network devices, servers and applications from one management server
Data collection either from SNMP-capable platforms or from native NetXMS agent
Configuration, administration and monitoring functions are accessible through multiplatform (Eclipse-based) and Web GUIs
The ability to send e-mails and SMS notifications or execute external programs as a reaction to any event, enables users to receive warning notifications based on collected values
The ability to organize monitored objects into hierarchical structure to represent service dependencies
Centralized remote agent upgrades
OSI Layer 2 and Layer 3 IP topology automatic discovery
Portable client library (C and Java APIs)
Flexible policy-based event processing (including correlation rules)
Remote actions
Flexible access control configuration
Built-in scripting engine for advanced automation and management

Project milestones
Notable project milestones  include:

October 2004: 0.1.4 is a first public release 
August 2005: 0.2.3 added event correlation support based on IP topology
January 2006: 0.2.9 introduced built-in scripting language NXSL
December 2008: 0.2.23 added Java API
July 2009: 0.2.27 added support for SNMPv3
February 2010: 1.0.0 released
May 2011: 1.1.1 introduced dashboards and zoning
September 2011: 1.1.4 introduced mobile client for Android
April 2012: 1.2.0 introduced Web GUI with desktop GUI look and feel
January 2013: 1.2.5 added support for mobile device monitoring and introduced an agent for Android

See also

 Network monitoring
 Comparison of network monitoring systems

References

External links
Official website

Internet Protocol based network software
Free network management software
Multi-agent network management software